Halifax County Courthouse is a historic county courthouse located at Halifax, Halifax County, North Carolina. It was designed by architects Wheeler & Stern and built in 1909–1910.  It is a three-story, tan brick, Classical Revival style building.  It has a tetrastyle Corinthian order portico flanked by two-story flat roofed wings and a two-stage cupola atop a shallow mansard roof.

The first Halifax county courthouse was built in 1759. In 1847, the first courthouse was replaced by a second, which itself was replaced in 1910 by a third courthouse erected on the site of the second courthouse. The 1910 courthouse was the present courthouse in 1938, the same year the famed 1938 photo of the drinking fountain on the county courthouse lawn was taken. A stone marker currently stands on the courthouse lawn where the photographed drinking fountain resided.

It was listed on the National Register of Historic Places in 1979.

References

Courthouses on the National Register of Historic Places in North Carolina
Neoclassical architecture in North Carolina
Government buildings completed in 1910
County courthouses in North Carolina
Buildings and structures in Halifax, North Carolina
National Register of Historic Places in Halifax County, North Carolina
Individually listed contributing properties to historic districts on the National Register in North Carolina